Adna Ferrin Weber, AKA Adna F. Weber (July 14, 1870 – February 28, 1968) was an American statistician and economist.

Biography
Adna Ferrian Weber Weber was born on July 14, 1870,  in Concord, New York on July 14, 1870. He held a PhD from Columbia University.

Weber served the Deputy Commissioner of Labor Statistics in New York.  In 1906, he co-founded the American Association for Labor Legislation and served as its first secretary (1906-1907).

Bibliography
 The Historical Development of the English Cabinet, Thesis (Ph. B.), Cornell University, Ithaca, N.Y., 1894
 with John MacMackin, Henry C. Southwick: Bulletin of the Bureau of Labor Statistics of the State of New York, New York, etc., 1899
 The Growth of Cities in the Nineteenth Century: A Study in Statistics, Dissertation, Columbia University, New York, 1899
 Growth of Cities in the United States, 1890-1900, 1901
 Social value on trade-unionism, Published by the Church Association for the Advancement of the Interests of Labor, New York, 1901
 Employers' Liability and Accident Insurance, in: Political Science Quarterly, volume 17, no. 2., Academy of Political Science, New York, etc., Jun. 1902, S. 256–283.
 Labor Legislation in New York, in: Monographs on social economics, 2, New York State Department of Labor, Albany, N.Y., 1904
 The Growth of Industry in New York, in: Monographs on social economics, 4, New York State Department of Labor, Albany, N.Y., 1904
 The Significance of Recent City Growth: The Era of Small Industrial Centres, in: Annals of the American Academy of Political and Social Science, volume 23, no. 2., American Academy of Political and Social Science, Philadelphia, 1904
 Present Status of Statistical Work and How it Needs to be Developed in the Service of the States, in: Publications of the American Statistical Association, volume 14, no. 106, The Association, Boston, Mass., Jun. 1914, S. 97–102.

References

External links
 
 Excerpt from The Growth of Cities in Nineteenth Century America

1870 births
1968 deaths
American statisticians
People from Erie County, New York
20th-century American economists
Columbia University alumni
20th-century American non-fiction writers